A jet aircraft (or simply jet) is an aircraft (nearly always a fixed-wing aircraft) propelled by jet engines.

Whereas the engines in propeller-powered aircraft generally achieve their maximum efficiency at much lower speeds and altitudes, jet engines achieve maximum efficiency at speeds close to or even well above the speed of sound.

The idea of the jet engine was not new, but the technical problems involved could not begin to be solved until the 1930s.
Frank Whittle, an English inventor and RAF officer, began development of a viable jet engine in 1928, and Hans von Ohain in Germany began work independently in the early 1930s. In August 1939 the turbojet powered Heinkel He 178, the world's first jet aircraft, made its first flight. A wide range of different types of jet aircraft exist, both for civilian and military purposes.

History

After the first instance of powered flight, a large number of jet engine designs were suggested. René Lorin, Morize, Harris proposed systems for creating a jet efflux. 

After other jet engines had been run, Romanian inventor Henri Coandă claimed to have built a jet-powered aircraft in 1910, the Coandă-1910. However, to support this claim, he had to make substantial alterations to the drawings which he used to support his subsequently debunked claims. In fact the ducted-fan engine backfired, setting the aircraft on fire before any flights were ever made, and it lacked nearly all of the features necessary for a jet engine - including a lack of fuel injection, and any concern about hot jet efflux being directed at a highly flammable fabric surface.

During the 1920s and 1930s a number of approaches were tried. A variety of motorjet, turboprop, pulsejet and rocket powered aircraft were designed. Rocket-engine research was being carried out in Germany and the first aircraft to fly under rocket power was the Lippisch Ente, in 1928. The Ente had previously been flown as a glider. The next year, in 1929, the Opel RAK.1 became the first purpose-built rocket aircraft to fly.

The turbojet was invented in the 1930s, independently by Frank Whittle and later Hans von Ohain. The first turbojet aircraft to fly was the Heinkel He 178, on August 27, 1939 in Rostock (Germany), powered by von Ohain's design. This was largely a proof of concept, as the problem of "creep" (metal fatigue caused by the high temperatures within the engine) had not been solved, and the engine quickly burned out. Von Ohain's design, an axial-flow engine, as opposed to Whittle's centrifugal flow engine, was eventually adopted by most manufacturers by the 1950s. 

The first flight of a jet-propelled aircraft to come to public attention was the Italian Caproni Campini N.1 motorjet prototype which flew on August 27, 1940. It was the first jet aircraft recognised by the Fédération Aéronautique Internationale (at the time the German He 178 program was still kept secret). Campini began development of the motorjet in 1932; it differed from a true turbojet in that the air was driven through by a piston engine, instead of the exhaust gas, a much more complex solution.

The British experimental Gloster E.28/39 first flew on May 15, 1941, powered by Sir Frank Whittle's turbojet. The United States Bell XP-59A flew on October 1, 1942, using two examples of a version of the Whittle engine built by General Electric. The Meteor was the first production jet, with the first orders for production examples being made on 8 August 1941, the prototype first flying on 5 March 1943 and the first production aircraft flying on 12 January 1944, while the first orders for production Me 262 aircraft were not issued until 25 May 1943, and the first production Me 262 did not fly until 28 March 1944 despite the Me 262 program having started earlier than that of the Meteor, as Projekt 1065, with initial plans drawn up by Waldemar Voigt's design team in April 1939.

The Messerschmitt Me 262 was the first operational jet fighter, manufactured by Germany during World War II and entering service on 19 April 1944 with Erprobungskommando 262 at Lechfeld just south of Augsburg. An Me 262 scored the first combat victory for a jet fighter on 26 July 1944. The Me 262 had first flown on April 18, 1941, but mass production did not start until early 1944, with the first squadrons operational that year, too late for any effect on the outcome of the World War II. While only around 15 Meteors were operational during WW2, up to 1,400 Me 262 were produced, with 300 entering combat. Only the rocket-propelled Messerschmitt Me 163 Komet was a faster operational aircraft during the war.

Around this time, mid 1944, the United Kingdom's Gloster Meteor was being used for defence of the UK against the V-1 flying bomb – itself a pulsejet-powered aircraft and direct ancestor of the cruise missile – and then ground-attack operations over Europe in the last months of the war. In 1944 Germany introduced the Arado Ar 234 jet reconnaissance and bomber aircraft into service, though chiefly used in the former role, with the Heinkel He 162 Spatz single-jet light fighter appearing at the end of 1944. USSR tested its own Bereznyak-Isayev BI-1 in 1942, but the project was scrapped by leader Joseph Stalin in 1945. The Imperial Japanese Navy also developed jet aircraft in 1945, including the Nakajima J9Y Kikka, a modified, and slightly smaller version of the Me 262 that had folding wings. By the end of 1945, the US had introduced their first jet fighter, the Lockheed P-80 Shooting Star into service and the UK its second fighter design, the de Havilland Vampire.

The US introduced the North American B-45 Tornado, their first jet bomber, into service in 1948. It was capable of carrying nuclear weapons, but was used for reconnaissance over Korea. On November 8, 1950, during the Korean War, United States Air Force Lt. Russell J. Brown, flying in an F-80, intercepted two North Korean MiG-15s near the Yalu River and shot them down in the first jet-to-jet dogfight in history. The UK put the English Electric Canberra into service in 1951 as a light bomber. It was designed to fly higher and faster than any interceptor.

BOAC operated the first commercial jet service, from London to Johannesburg, in 1952 with the de Havilland Comet jetliner. This highly innovative aircraft travelled far faster and higher than propeller aircraft, was much quieter, smoother, and had stylish blended wings containing hidden jet engines. However, due to a design defect, and use of aluminium alloys, the aircraft suffered catastrophic metal fatigue which led to several crashes, which gave time for the Boeing 707 to enter service in 1958 and thus to dominate the market for civilian airliners. The underslung engines were found to be advantageous in the event of a propellant leak, and so the 707 looked rather different from the Comet: the 707 has a shape that is effectively the same as that of contemporary aircraft, with marked commonality still evident today for example with the 737 (fuselage) and A340 (single deck, swept wing, four below-wing engines).

Turbofan aircraft with far greater fuel efficiency began entering service in the 1950s and 1960s, and became the most commonly used type of jet.

The Tu-144 supersonic transport was the fastest commercial jet aircraft at Mach 2.35. It went into service in 1975, but was withdrawn from commercial service shortly afterwards. The Mach 2 Concorde entered service in 1976 and flew for 27 years.

The fastest military jet aircraft was the SR-71 Blackbird at Mach 3.35.

Other jets

Most people use the term 'jet aircraft' to denote gas turbine based airbreathing jet engines, but rockets and scramjets are both also propelled by jet propulsion.

Cruise missiles are single-use unmanned jet aircraft, powered predominately by ramjets or turbojets or sometimes turbofans, but they will often have a rocket propulsion system for initial propulsion.

The fastest airbreathing jet aircraft is the unmanned X-43 scramjet at around Mach 9–10.

The fastest manned (rocket) aircraft is the X-15 at Mach 6.85.

The Space Shuttle, while far faster than the X-43 or X-15, was not regarded as an aircraft during ascent as it was carried ballistically by rocket thrust, rather than the air. During re-entry it was classed (like a glider) as an unpowered aircraft. The first flight was in 1981.

The Bell 533 (1964), Lockheed XH-51 (1965), and Sikorsky S-69 (1977-1981) are examples of compound helicopter designs where jet exhaust added to forward thrust. The Hiller YH-32 Hornet and Fairey Ultra-light Helicopter were among the many helicopters where the rotors were driven by tip jets.

Jet-powered wingsuits exist - powered by model aircraft jet engines - but of short duration and needing to be launched at height.

Aerodynamics
Because of the way they work, the typical exhaust speed of jet engines is transonic or faster, therefore most jet aircraft need to fly at high speeds, either supersonic or speeds just below the speed of sound ("transonic") so as to achieve efficient flight. Aerodynamics is therefore an important consideration.

Jet aircraft are usually designed using the Whitcomb area rule, which says that the total area of cross-section of the aircraft at any point along the aircraft from the nose must be approximately the same as that of a Sears-Haack body. A shape with that property minimises the production of shockwaves which would waste energy.

Jet engines

There are several types of engine which operate by expelling hot gas:

turbojet
turbofan (which come in two main forms low bypass turbofan and high bypass turbofan)
rocket

The different types are used for different purposes.

Rockets are the oldest type, and are mainly used when extremely high speeds are needed, or operation at extremely high altitudes where there is insufficient air to operate a jet engine. Due to the extreme, typically hypersonic, exhaust velocity and the necessity of oxidiser being carried on board, they consume propellant extremely quickly, making them impractical for routine transportation.

Turbojets are the second oldest type; they have a high, usually supersonic, exhaust speed and low frontal cross-section, and so are best suited to high-speed, usually supersonic, flight. Although once widely used, they are relatively inefficient compared to turboprop and turbofans for subsonic flight. The last major aircraft to use turbojets were Concorde and Tu-144 supersonic transports.

Low bypass turbofans have a lower exhaust speed than turbojets, and are mostly used for high sonic, transonic, and low supersonic speeds. High bypass turbofans are relatively efficient, and are used by subsonic aircraft such as airliners.

Flying characteristics
Jet aircraft fly considerably differently than propeller aircraft.

One difference is that jet engines respond relatively slowly. This complicates takeoff and landing maneuvers.
In particular, during takeoff, propeller aircraft engines blow air over their wings and that gives more lift and a shorter takeoff. These differences caught out some early BOAC Comet pilots.

Propulsive efficiency

In aircraft overall propulsive efficiency  is the efficiency, in percent, with which the energy contained in a vehicle's propellant is converted into useful energy, to replace losses due to air drag, gravity, and acceleration. It can also be stated as the proportion of the mechanical energy actually used to propel the aircraft. It is always less than 100% because of kinetic energy loss to the exhaust, and less-than-ideal efficiency of the propulsive mechanism, whether a propeller, a jet exhaust, or a fan. In addition, propulsive efficiency is greatly dependent on air density and airspeed.

The cycle efficiency, in percent, is the proportion of energy that can be derived from the energy source that is converted to mechanical energy by the engine.

For jet aircraft the propulsive efficiency (essentially energy efficiency) is highest when the engine emits an exhaust jet at a speed that is the same as, or nearly the same as, the vehicle velocity. The exact formula for air-breathing engines as given in the literature, is

where c is the exhaust speed, and v is the speed of the aircraft.

Range

For a long range jet operating in the stratosphere, the speed of sound is constant, hence flying at fixed angle of attack and constant Mach number causes the aircraft to climb, without changing the value of the local speed of sound. In this case:

where  is the cruise Mach number and  the local speed of sound. The range equation can be shown to be:

which is known as the Breguet range equation after the French aviation pioneer Louis Charles Breguet.

See also
 Coandă-1910
 Commercial aviation
 Contrail
 Jet airliner
 Jet noise
 Jumbo jet
 Very light jet
 List of jet aircraft of World War II

References

Citations

Bibliography

 Lutz Warsitz: The First Jet Pilot – The Story of German Test Pilot Erich Warsitz, Pen and Sword Books Ltd., England, 2009, English Edition

External links

 The official Erich Warsitz website (the world's first jet pilot), inclusive rare videos (Heinkel He 178) and audio commentaries